In Australian Aboriginal mythology , Wuluwaid (see also Wuluwait) is a rain god.  He is a god from northern Arnhem Land (northern Australia) and is known to work with Bunbulama as a rainmaker.  He is also recorded by Charles Mountford and Ainslie Roberts as a boatman who ferries the souls of the dead to Purelko, the aboriginal afterlife.

Sources

The Dreamtime (1965) Ainslie Roberts and Charles P Mountford, Adelaide, Rigby Pty Ltd.

Australian Aboriginal gods
Sky and weather gods
Death gods
Rain deities